Geheimarchiv an der Elbe (Secret Archive on the Elbe) is an East German war film set in the last days of World War II in Europe and directed by Kurt Jung-Alsen.  It stars Hans-Peter Minetti, Albert Hetterle and Günther Simon. Based on a novel by Alexander Nassibow Drehbuch, it was released in 1963. The film follows the exploits of a Soviet communist officer, Major Kerimov (Minetti), who is sent to recover a Secret Archive from the Nazis. The film was Jung-Alsen's last film for DEFA.

Plot
Shortly before the end of the Second World War: SS-Gruppenführer Upitz knows that Germany has lost the war. He tries to give himself an advantage for the time after the war and accepts an offer from the Americans. He receives immunity from prosecution if, in return, he hands over to them the Gestapo's secret archive, which is hidden on the Elbe River in Meissen. It contains the data of all agents placed by the Gestapo in the Soviet Union and the Balkans. The Soviet Abwehrdienst is also after this data, so Upitz wants to lay a false trail.

Upitz has the welder Max Wiesbach taken to an underground tunnel in Riesa. There he is to seal a leak under water. Wiesbach is convinced that he has sealed a leak in the secret archive and passes this information on to a convinced communist who is sent to the Soviet front a short time later and defects to the Russians there. He tells them about the secret archive in Riesa, but the Russians believe the secret archive is in Meissen. They want security. Together with Herbert Lange from Riesa, the Soviet communist Major Kerimov is sent to Riesa to locate the secret archive. Lange's wife believes her husband to be dead. When he suddenly appears at the door and announces that he will soon have to leave, Mrs. Lange becomes hysterical. Lange wants to get a doctor, but is shot in the street as an apparent fugitive. Kerimov is now on his own. He receives help from convinced communists. He is hired as a driver in the factory where Max Wiesbach also works as a welder. Kerimov soon finds out that Max Wiesbach is faking and that the secret archive must be in Meissen.

Meanwhile, Upitz has reached an agreement with the American Tedder to hand over the archive to the Americans in the next few days. Tedder informs a middleman who is to organize and supervise the removal. Upitz and the middleman each receive a comb half as an identification mark. Kerimov succeeds in eavesdropping on the conversations and acquiring the middleman's comb piece. With the Communists, he organizes a cargo plane. He gets in touch with Upitz and supervises the transfer of the archive files to the Soviet plane. Upitz also boards the plane, as he had arranged with Tedder. When the plane is in the air, Upitz wants to know where they are going. When Kerimov replies that the flight is going to Moscow, Upitz reacts at first amused and is then speechless.

Cast
Hans-Peter Minetti as Major Kerimov
Albert Hetterle as Oberst Rybin
Günther Simon as SS-Gruppenführer Upitz
Hans-Joachim Martens as Standartenführer Bolm
Günther Haack as Sturmführer Torp
Alfred Struw as Adjutant von Upitz
Johannes Arpe as Kümetz
Rudolf Ulrich as Herbert Lange

Production
The film was shot by cinematographer  Peter Krause, with a screenplay by Peter Brock.  The film score was composed by André Asriel.

Release and reception
Geheimarchiv an der Elbe premiered on 18 April 1963. The film was described by author Bernard Stöver as "Eastern propaganda".

References

External links
 

1963 films
East German films
Films directed by Kurt Jung-Alsen
1960s German-language films
German World War II films
1960s German films